Licey al Medio is a municipality (municipio) of the Santiago province in the Dominican Republic. Within the municipality there is one municipal district (distrito municipal): Las Palomas. This is an important municipality of the province because Cibao International Airport is located here.

Economy 
The main economic activities of Licey al Medio are the swine and poultry production and there is a robust metalworking industry. Licey holds economic exchange links with Tamboril, Santiago, Moca and Santo Domingo, mainly for its production of chickens and eggs. It has an industrial park zone containing 7 companies, with approximately 275 employees in total.

Notable people 
 Eugenio de Jesús Marcano Fondeur, scientist and botanist
 Manuel de Jesús Peña y Reynoso, writer
 Orlando Alba, linguist

References

Populated places in Santiago Province (Dominican Republic)
Municipalities of the Dominican Republic